Simon James Harbaugh (July 18, 1873  – May 28, 1960) was an American golfer. He competed in the men's individual event at the 1904 Summer Olympics.

References

External links
 

1873 births
1960 deaths
Amateur golfers
American male golfers
Olympic golfers of the United States
Golfers at the 1904 Summer Olympics
People from Bedford County, Pennsylvania
Sportspeople from Pennsylvania